is a Japanese manga artist. She is known for her extremely cute art style featured in her many published manga, some of which are boys' love (BL) series.

On January 25, 2016, Hoshino announced that she had gotten married. In September 2016, she gave birth to her first child, a son. In March 2019, she gave birth to her second son.

Works

Manga

Anime
 Mawaru Penguindrum (2011) – character design
 A Certain Magical Index: The Movie – The Miracle of Endymion (2013) – guest character design
 Tsukumogami Kashimasu (2018) – original character design

References

External links

  
  
 

1978 births
Japanese female comics artists
Japanese women writers
Living people
Manga artists from Nagano Prefecture
Women manga artists